The 2013 Big South men's basketball tournament was the postseason men's basketball tournament for the Big South Conference that took place from March 5–10, 2013, at the brand new HTC Center in Conway, South Carolina. Both semifinal games were broadcast on ESPN3, and the championship game was televised on ESPN2.

Both the men's and women's tournaments were held together at the HTC Center.  The conference hadn't held combined men’s and women’s tournaments since 2001–02 when both events were played at the Roanoke Civic Center The tournament was won by the fifth-seeded North Division Liberty Flames, their third conference title, and first since 2004. With four wins in the tournament, including two over both divisions' top seeds, Liberty won the conference's automatic bid to the NCAA tournament, becoming only the second 20-loss team in the tournament's history (the other being Coppin State in 2007–08).

Format
With the addition of Longwood, and Presbyterian completing its Division I transition, all 12 teams were eligible for the 2013 tournament. Seeding was decided by divisions - the top two teams with the best overall conference records in each division received the top four seeds in the championship and first-round byes. The remaining seeds were determined based on division finish. In the event of a tie for a particular seed, the seed was determined within each division.

Bracket

 * Indicates overtime victory

References

Tournament
Big South Conference men's basketball tournament
Big South Conference men's basketball tournament
Big South Conference men's basketball tournament